The National Farmers' Bank of Owatonna, Minnesota, United States, is a historic bank building designed by Louis Sullivan, with decorative elements by George Elmslie. It was built in 1908, and was the first of Sullivan's "jewel box" bank designs. The building is clad in red brick with green terra cotta bands, and features two large arches on its street-facing facades.  Single-story wings, originally housing bank offices, extend along each side. Internal elements include two stained-glass windows designed by Louis J. Millet, a mural by Oskar Gross, and four immense cast iron electroliers designed by Elmslie and cast by Winslow Brothers Company.

The officers of the National Farmers' Bank sought Sullivan out, in part because they wanted a fresh idea of a bank building that would suit their specific needs, and they felt that conventional bank architecture of the time would not meet those.  The building Sullivan designed included a farmers' exchange room, where its clients might do business with each other, a women's consultation room, a conference room for the bank board, and the president's office.  All of these rooms were richly decorated, with custom furniture.

The bank was remodeled in 1940, and many of the interior architectural elements were destroyed. Subsequent work in 1958 and from 1976 to 1981 restored it to its original grandeur. On January 7, 1976, it was recognized as a National Historic Landmark for its architectural significance.  The building now houses a branch of the Wells Fargo bank.  It is also a contributing property to the Owatonna Commercial Historic District.

Images

See also
 List of National Historic Landmarks in Minnesota
 National Register of Historic Places listings in Steele County, Minnesota

References

Further reading
Millett, Larry. The curve of the arch: The story of Louis Sullivan's Owatonna Bank (1985). Minnesota Historical Society Press.

External links

"Why a Minnesota bank building ranks among the nation’s most significant architecture", PBS NewsHour, June 15, 2022.
Minnesota Public Radio: Louis Sullivan's Owatonna Bank
Digital Imaging Project: National Farmers' Bank
NHL summary

1908 establishments in Minnesota
Art Nouveau architecture in Minnesota
Art Nouveau commercial buildings
Bank buildings on the National Register of Historic Places in Minnesota
Buildings and structures in Steele County, Minnesota
Commercial buildings completed in 1908
Individually listed contributing properties to historic districts on the National Register in Minnesota
Louis Sullivan buildings
National Historic Landmarks in Minnesota
National Register of Historic Places in Steele County, Minnesota
Wells Fargo buildings